Brimidius annulicornis is a species of beetle in the family Cerambycidae. It was described by Stephan von Breuning in 1954. It is known from Tanzania and Rwanda.

References

Phrissomini
Beetles described in 1954